Slavski Laz is a village on the left bank of the Kolpa River in the Municipality of Kostel in southern Slovenia. The area is part of the traditional region of Lower Carniola and is now included in the Southeast Slovenia Statistical Region.

The local church, built on a small elevation outside the village to the northeast, is dedicated to the Holy Trinity. It dates to the 17th century.

References

External links
Slavski Laz on Geopedia

Populated places in the Municipality of Kostel